"Nothing as Original as You" is a song written by Don Reid, and recorded by American country music group The Statler Brothers.  It was released in October 1979 as the third single from the album The Originals.  The song reached #10 on the Billboard Hot Country Singles & Tracks chart.

Chart performance

References

1979 singles
1979 songs
The Statler Brothers songs
Songs written by Don Reid (singer)
Mercury Records singles
Song recordings produced by Jerry Kennedy